Mated in the Wilds is a 1921 Australian silent film directed by P. J. Ramster. It is a melodrama about a love triangle among members of Sydney society.

The movie is considered a lost film.

Plot
Two men, flying ace Justin Strong (Fred Oppey) and foreigner Montgomery Lyle (Anthony Aroney) are both in love with sportswoman Elsa Hope (Elsa Granger). Justin and Monty leave by motorcycle on a surveying trip and Monty leads his rival in the desert to die. He tells Elsa that Justin was killed by aboriginals. Elsa insists on seeing Justin's grave and drives out to the desert with Monty and her mother. Monty ties Mrs Hopes to a tree and is about to abduct Elsa but she pulls a gun on him and eventually finds Justin living with some friendly aborigines.

Cast
Elsa Granger as Elsa Hope
Anthony Aroney as Montgomery Lyle
Fred Oppey as Justin Strong
Maud de Grange
William Shepherd
Lydia Rich
David Edelsten
Louis Witts
Albert Germain
S.P. Woodford
Phillip Raftus
Kathleen Ramster
Winifred Law
Dorothy Shepherd
Nancy Simpson

Production
The cast was unpaid and could only work weekends so the film took over a year to complete. Actors were drawn from P. J. Ramster's acting school.

References

External links

Mated in the Wilds at National Film and Sound Archive

1921 films
Australian drama films
Australian silent feature films
Australian black-and-white films
1921 drama films
Lost Australian films
Melodrama films
1921 lost films
Lost drama films
Silent drama films